Wynyard Park may refer to:
 Wynyard Park, County Durham, a stately home in County Durham, England (formerly a seat of the Marquesses of Londonderry)
 Wynyard Park, Sydney, a public park in Sydney